Jelena Lengold (born 1959 in Kruševac) is a Serbian poet, novelist and journalist. A longtime cultural reporter for Radio Belgrade, Lengold has published a number of books, including poetry, novels, and short stories. Her short story collection Vašarski Mađioničar or "Fairground Magician" as it translates in English, was published by Istros Books in 2013. "Fairground Magician" won the EU Prize for Literature.

Works

Poetry collections 
 Raspad botanike (1982)
 Vreteno (1984)
 Podneblje maka (1986)
 Prolazak anđela (1989)
 Sličice iz života kapelmajstora (1991)
 Bunar teških reči (2011)
 Izaberi jedno mesto (2016)

Short story collections 
 Pokisli lavovi (1994)
 Lift (1999)
 Vašarski mađioničar (2008, 2009, 2012)
 Prestraši me (2009)
 U tri kod Kandinskog (2013)
 Raščarani svet (2016)

Novels 
 Baltimor (2003, 2011)
 Odustajanje (2018)

References

1959 births
Serbian novelists
Serbian women poets
Living people
Serbian women journalists
Serbian women novelists